Kenneth J. Balkus Jr. is an American chemist and materials scientist. He is professor of chemistry and former department chair at The University of Texas at Dallas. He is a Fellow of the American Chemical Society and a recipient of the ACS Doherty Award. His well known work is synthesis of zeolite UTD-1, the first high-silica zeolite to contain a one-dimensional, extra-large 14-ring pore system. He is also co-founder of DB Therapeutics, a company developing cancer therapies.

Early life and education 
Kenneth received his B.S., in chemistry from Worcester Polytechnic Institute, with distinction. He then moved to University of Florida for PhD in inorganic chemistry, where he worked with Russell S. Drago.

Career 
Balkus joined University of Pennsylvania as postdoctoral associate in 1986 with Bradford B. Wayland. He joined The University of Texas at Dallas in 1988 where he is currently professor of chemistry and professor of materials science and engineering and leading chemistry department.

Research 
Most of the research in his lab involves nanoporous metal oxides which include zeolites and related
molecular sieves as well as hybrid frameworks.

 Synthesis and Characterization Novel microporous and mesoporous Materials
 Molecular Sieve/Polymer Composite Membranes
 Nanoparticles, Nanotubes and Quantum Dots for Photoconversion Processes
 Nanotube/Nanowire films for Energy Storage
 Molecular Sieve Immobilized Enzymes
 Drug Delivery, Wound Healing and Theranostics
 Electrospinning of NanFibers and Composites
 Molecular Sieve Based Optical and Electronic Chemical Sensors

Awards and honours 

 2012 US Presidential Scholar Teacher Award
 2011 ACS Fellow
 2008 ACS Doherty Award
 2008 Taiwan Chemistry Research Promotion Center Lectureship
 1998 UOP Distinguished Lecturer
 1991-1996 NSF Presidential Young Investigator Award
 1986 ACS Florida Section Speaker Award
 1986 ACS Sherwin-Williams Award - Finalist

References 

Year of birth missing (living people)
Living people
American chemists
People from Dallas
University of Texas at Dallas faculty